The Blue Note Reissue Series: Thad Jones / Mel Lewis is a 2 LP compilation album of songs taken from Blue Note (Solid State) releases of the Thad Jones / Mel Lewis Jazz Orchestra.

Track listing

Side A
"Jive Samba" 
"Mean What You Say" 
"A Child is Born" 
Side B
"Tiptoe" 
"Get Out of My Life" 
"Come Sunday" 
"Woman's Got Soul" 
"Groove Merchant" 
Side C
"Big Dipper" 
"Little Pixie" 
"Central Park North" 
Side D
"Mornin' Reverend" 
"You Won't Let Me Go" 
"Fine Brown Frame" 
"Be Anything (But Be Mine)"

Personnel
See personnel listing of original recordings:

References
Blue Note BN-LA392-H2 at jazzdisco.org

1975 compilation albums
The Thad Jones/Mel Lewis Orchestra compilation albums
Blue Note Records compilation albums